Christopher Tiao (born May 30, 2001) is an American soccer player who plays as a defender for New York Red Bulls II in the USL Championship.

Career

Youth, College & Amateur
Tiao is a member of the New York Red Bulls Academy. During the 2019 USL Championship season he appeared for New York Red Bulls II.

Later in 2019, Tiao has committed to play college soccer at Rutgers University.

References

External links 
 
 ussoccerda.com profile

2001 births
Living people
American soccer players
New York Red Bulls II players
Association football defenders
Soccer players from New Jersey
USL Championship players
People from Randolph, New Jersey
Sportspeople from Morris County, New Jersey
Rutgers Scarlet Knights men's soccer players